The Don Bridge is a motorway viaduct in South Yorkshire, England.

History
The line of the fifteen-mile Doncaster By-Pass Motorway was fixed in the spring of 1957.

Design
Each carriageway is carried on a separate structure. Each carriageway is supported by five riveted steel girders. There are 2,225 tons of structural steelwork.

Construction
Construction of the Doncaster bypass started on 22 June 1959. There were 28 bridges in the contract for the Doncaster bypass, including five railway bridges.

The fabrication of the steelwork for the bridge took place at the West Bromwich Works. The steel superstructure for the bridge was launched from one end of the bridge on an embankment. The steel fabrication was sprayed with zinc. The concrete and steel design is known as composite construction.

The concrete beams were made by Ferro Concrete and Stone Co. (North Notts) Ltd of Retford.

The bypass was built by a consortium including Holland, Hannen & Cubitts, on a £6 million contract.

Structure
The south side of the bridge is in Warmsworth, and the north side is in Sprotbrough and Cusworth. The bridge crosses the Trans Pennine Trail (National Cycle Route 62), which follows the river. It is situated around one mile north of junction 36.

References

External links

 Motorway Archive
 SABRE

1961 establishments in England
Bridges completed in 1961
Bridges over the River Don, South Yorkshire
Buildings and structures in the Metropolitan Borough of Doncaster
Concrete bridges in the United Kingdom
Motorway bridges in England
Plate girder bridges